Tornyosnémeti is a village in Borsod-Abaúj-Zemplén County in northeastern Hungary adjacent to the border with Slovakia.

References

Populated places in Borsod-Abaúj-Zemplén County